"Vanchiyoor Athiyara Madhom" is a Malayala Brahmin "family name" and the priests (Thanthri) of this family (Attiyara Potty of Vanchiyoor) still holds a membership in Ettara Yogam in modern times. The Vanchiyoor Athiyara Madhom Brahmins were one among the families that constituted the Ettara Yogam (the traditional custodians of the day-to-day administration of the Sree Padmanabha Swami temple until Maharaja Marthanda Varma's reign). The Vanchiyoor Athiyara Madhom was also known as "Ambalayalam".

According to the 1998 book, Sree Padmanabha Swamy Temple, written by Princess Aswathi Thirunal Gowri Lakshmi Bayi, the Ettarayogam still exists in principle.

References
 Sree Padmanabha Swamy Temple, written by Princess Aswathi Thirunal Gowri Lakshmi Bayi

People of the Kingdom of Travancore